Euptilomyia is a genus of parasitic flies in the family Tachinidae. There is one described species in Euptilomyia, E. frontalis.

Distribution
Brazil

References

Diptera of South America
Dexiinae
Tachinidae genera
Taxa named by Charles Henry Tyler Townsend
Monotypic Brachycera genera